A thyrsus /ˈθɜːrsəs/ or thyrsos /ˈθɜːrˌsɒs/ (Ancient Greek: θύρσος) was a wand or staff of giant fennel (Ferula communis) covered with ivy vines and leaves, sometimes wound with taeniae and topped with a pine cone, artichoke, or by a bunch of vine-leaves and grapes or ivy-leaves and berries, carried during Hellenic festivals and religious ceremonies. The thyrsus is typically associated with the Greek god Dionysus, and represents a symbol of prosperity, fertility, and hedonism similarly to Dionysus.

Religious and ceremonial use 
In Greek religion, the staff was carried by  the votaries of Dionysus. Euripides wrote that honey dripped from the thyrsos staves that the Bacchic maenads carried. The thyrsus was a sacred instrument at religious rituals and fêtes.

The fabulous history of Bacchus relates that he converted the thyrsi carried by himself and his followers into dangerous weapons, by concealing an iron point in the head of leaves. Hence his thyrsus is called "a spear enveloped in vine-leaves", and its point was thought to incite to madness.

Symbolism 
The thyrsus, associated with Dionysus (or Bacchus) and his followers, the Satyrs and Maenads (or Bacchants), is a symbol of prosperity, fertility, hedonism, and pleasure/enjoyment in general. The thyrsus was tossed in the Bacchic dance:
Pentheus: The thyrsus—in my right hand shall I hold it?
Or thus am I more like a Bacchanal?
Dionysus: In thy right hand, and with thy right foot raise it".

Sometimes the thyrsus was displayed in conjunction with a kantharos wine cup, another symbol of Dionysus, forming a male-and-female combination.

Literature 

In the Iliad, Diomedes, one of the leading warriors of the Achaeans, mentions the thyrsus while speaking to Glaucus, one of the Lycian commanders in the Trojan army, about Lycurgus, the king of Scyros:
He it was that/drove the nursing women who were in charge/of frenzied Bacchus through the land of Nysa,/and they flung their thyrsi on the ground as/murderous Lycurgus beat them with his oxgoad. The thyrsus is explicitly attributed to Dionysus and his followers in Euripides's play, The Bacchae, a Greek tragedy describing the degradation of Thebes in vindication for the sullied name of Dionysus's mortal mother. The story surrounds the murder of the young king and indoctrination of all of the Theban women into Dionysus's cult, with the thyrsus serving as a badge of sorts for members.
To raise my Bacchic shout, and clothe all who respond/ In fawnskin habits, and put my thyrsus in their hands–/ The weapon wreathed with ivy-shoots... Euripides also writes, "There's a brute wildness in the fennel-wands—Reverence it well."Plato describes the hedonistic connotation of the thyrsus, and thereby Dionysus, in his philosophical Phaedo:
I conceive that the founders of the mysteries had a real meaning and were not mere triflers when they intimated in a figure long ago that he who passes unsanctified and uninitiated into the world below will live in a slough, but that he who arrives there after initiation and purification will dwell with the gods. For 'many,' as they say in the mysteries, 'are the thyrsus bearers, but few are the mystics,' – meaning, as I interpret the words, the true philosophers.In Part II of Johann Wolfgang von Goethe's Faust, Mephistopheles tries to catch a Lamia, only to find out that she is an illusion and instead holds a thyrsus. The play contains major themes of sin and hedonism, and makes connection to Dionysus through the thyrsus:
Well, then, a tall one I will catch... And now a thyrsus-pole I snatch! Only a pine-cone as its head.Robert Browning mentions the thyrsus in passing in The Bishop Orders His Tomb at St Praxed's Church, as the dying bishop confuses Christian piety with classical extravagance. Ovid talks about Bacchus carrying a thyrsus and his followers doing the same in his Metamorphoses Book III, which is a retelling of The Bacchae.
The bas-relief in bronze ye promised me,/Those Pans and nymphs ye wot of, and perchance/Some tripod, thyrsus, with a vase or so.

Music
In the BTS song "Dionysus" from album Map of the Soul: Persona, the thyrsus is mentioned as one of the imagery representing Dionysus.

Gallery

See also 
Cult of Dionysus

Notes

References 
 Casadio, Giovanni; Johnston, Patricia A., Mystic Cults in Magna Graecia, University of Texas Press, 2009
 Ferdinand Joseph M. de Waele, The magic staff or rod in Græco-Italian antiquity, Drukkerij Erasmus, 1927

Attribution

External links 

 Thyrsus at A Dictionary of Greek and Roman Antiquities (1890)
 Thyrsus at Encyclopædia Britannica Online
 Thyrsus at The Ancient Library
 Thyrsus at Perseus Project

Religious objects
Greek mythology
Mythological objects
Wands
Dionysus